Open de Canarias may refer to:

Turespana Open De Canaria, originally called the Tenerife Open, played between 1989 and 1995
Abama Open de Canarias, played on just one occasion in 2005, also a Challenge Tour event
Turespana Masters, Turespana Masters Open de Canarias, the 1997 edition of the Turespana Masters
Open de España, the 2002 to 2004 Spanish Opens